On the Side of the Road is a 2013 Israeli documentary film written and directed by Lia Tarachansky. The film  focuses on Israeli collective denial of the events of 1948 that led to the country's Independence and the Palestinian refugee problem. It follows war veterans Tikva Honig-Parnass and Amnon Noiman as they tackle their denial of their actions in the war. The film also tells the story of the director, Lia Tarachansky, an Israeli who grew up in a settlement in the West Bank but as an adult began to realize the problems of the Israeli Occupation for the Palestinians. The film was shot over the course of five years and premiered at the First International Independent Film Festival in Tel Aviv.

Synopsis
Lia Tarachansky grew up in a settlement. When the Second Intifada broke out in 2000 her family moved to Canada. There, for the first time she met Palestinians and "discovered" their history and learned why they were fighting Israel in the first place.

When she became a journalist, she returned to Israel to become the local correspondent for The Real News network. Returning for the first time to her settlement, she "discovers" the Palestinians next door as she travels the West Bank covering the Israeli military occupation. In this film she meets with those who played a personal role in the events of 1948 and like her, "discovered" that which they had not only erased from their consciousness, but erased from the map. For years she tries to convince veterans of the 1948 war who started the conflict as we know it today to face the most difficult questions and dig deep into their memories. This is a film about the questions Israelis cannot ask, about memories that cannot be uncovered, and the history which is fighting to come to light.

It was then, in 1948, three years after the Holocaust that the nascent Jewish state was created on Palestinian land. The war that followed after Arab armies started to invade Israel led to two-thirds of the Palestinian people becoming refugees. Those who fled or were expelled to this day remain in camps throughout the Arab world, the West Bank and Gaza. In 2009 the Israeli government proposed a law that forbade mourning this history—a law that attempted to criminalize history itself.

Featuring
Lia Tarachansky, an Israeli former settler
Eitan Bronstein, Director of the Israeli organization Zochrot
Khalil Abu Hamdeh, a Palestinian descendant of 1948 refugees
Amnon Noiman, an Israeli veteran of the 1948 war
Tikva Honig-Parnass, an Israeli veteran of the 1948 war

Production
The film was shot over a period of five years. It was originally titled "Seven Deadly Myths" and was conceived as a journalistic film featuring the New Historians. Following a personal transformation, director Tarachansky decided to focus the film on the personal stories of Israeli veterans and as a result the film changed in content and title.

Release
On the Side of the Road premiered at the First International Festival on Nakba and Return, which took place at Cinematheque Tel Aviv. The film premiered in the West Bank city of Ramallah in March, at the Franco-German Cultural Center in March 2014.  The film was later featured at the Eye on Palestine film festival in Ghent, Belgium and at the Nakba Film Festival in Australia.

Awards
In June 2014 the film received Honorable Mention at the International Independent Film Awards in California.

Taboo
According to the film's director, the mass displacement of Palestinians in 1948 remains a taboo in Israeli society. In an interview with Frank Barat she said "The strongest element of Israeli DNA is knowing what questions you cannot ask". Controversy arose at the festival at which On the Side of the Road premiered when Israeli Parliamentarian Ayelet Shaked argued that state subsidy of cultural events referring to the events of 1948 as the "Nakba" is in violation of the 2011 Nakba Law.

References

External links
 
 Naretive Productions
 Cinematheque Tel Aviv
 First International Film Festival on Nakba and Return
 Lisa Goldman, The Daily Beast
 Belen Fernandez, Al Jazeera
 Frank Barat, The New Internationalist
 Louis De Geest, De Wereld Morgen
 Ksenia Svetlova, Israel's Channel 9
 Stefano Nanni, Osservatoria Iraq

2013 films
Israeli documentary films
Israeli historical films
2010s English-language films
2010s Hebrew-language films
Documentary films about the Arab–Israeli conflict
Films set in 1948
2013 documentary films
2013 multilingual films
Israeli multilingual films